Cecelia Bolaji Dada  (born 7 July 1966) was a former vice-chairman of Apapa Local Government and current commissioner for Women Affairs and Poverty Alleviation in Lagos state.

Early life and education 
Dada was born in Lagos and received B.Sc (Hon.) in industrial chemistry from the Lagos State University in 1991 and further obtained a master of science degree in corporate governance from Leeds Metropolitan University in 2009.

Political career 
Dada's foray into administration began when she was appointed as a member of the Lagos State Sports Commission and then later became the Executive Secretary and 2-time Vice-chairman of Apapa Local Government where she received an award as the 2010 best Vice-Chairman in Lagos.

Dada was later appointed by Governor Sanwaolu to serve as the Commissioner for Women Affairs and Poverty Alleviation in 2020.

Personal life 
Dada is married  with children.

References 

Living people
1966 births
Yoruba politicians
Lagos State politicians
Commissioners of ministries of Lagos State